Wilson Emerson Joseph (October 6, 1897 – November 1966), sometimes listed as "William", was an American Negro league infielder in the 1920s.

A native of Montgomery, Alabama, Joseph was the younger brother of fellow-Negro leaguer Newt Joseph. He made his Negro leagues debut in 1924 with the Indianapolis ABCs and Cleveland Browns, and played the following season with the Birmingham Black Barons. Joseph died in Wichita, Kansas in 1966 at age 69.

References

External links
 and Seamheads

1897 births
1966 deaths
Birmingham Black Barons players
Cleveland Browns (baseball) players
Indianapolis ABCs players
Baseball players from Montgomery, Alabama
20th-century African-American sportspeople
Baseball infielders